Murtaz Shelia (born 25 March 1969) is a Georgian former professional footballer who played as a defender. He was capped 29 times for the Georgia national team between 1994 and 1998. His clubs included Dinamo Tbilisi, 1. FC Saarbrücken, Spartak-Alania Vladikavkaz, Manchester City and Lokomotivi Tbilisi.

Club career
With Dinamo Tbilisi, Shelia formed part of a Georgian league championship winning team for five years in a row, from 1991 to 1995. In 1995, he joined Spartak-Alania Vladikavkaz of the Russian league, where, as one of five Georgians on the books of the North Ossetians, he helped the club win the Russian league title in his first season.

Two years later Shelia joined English club Manchester City, where his former Dinamo Tbilisi team-mate Georgi Kinkladze was the star player. He marked his debut with a goal at Birmingham City, though Manchester City lost the match 2–1. Six weeks later he was joined in defence by another Georgian, Kakhaber Tskhadadze, but as the season reached its conclusion injuries restricted Shelia's appearances, and he scored just once more against Nottingham Forest. At the end of the season Manchester City were relegated, entering the third tier for the first time in their history. The following season Shelia made just three appearances before sustaining a career-threatening injury against Reading in October 1998, his final appearance for the club.

In 2000, he was released from his contract by Dinamo Tbilisi. After briefly attempting a comeback with Lokomotivi Tbilisi, he retired in 2001.

International career
With the Georgia national team Shelia won 1998 Malta International Football Tournament.

References

External links
 

1969 births
Living people
Soviet footballers
Footballers from Georgia (country)
Association football defenders
Georgia (country) international footballers
2. Bundesliga players
English Football League players
Russian Premier League players
FC Dinamo Tbilisi players
1. FC Saarbrücken players
FC Spartak Vladikavkaz players
Manchester City F.C. players
FC Locomotive Tbilisi players
Expatriate footballers from Georgia (country)
Expatriate sportspeople from Georgia (country) in Germany
Expatriate footballers in Germany
Expatriate sportspeople from Georgia (country) in Russia
Expatriate footballers in Russia
Expatriate sportspeople from Georgia (country) in England